Petar "Pero" Škorić (born 18 June 1969) is a Serbian former footballer. He was a member of the Yugoslavia under-20 team that won the 1987 FIFA World Youth Championship.

References

1969 births
Living people
Footballers from Novi Sad
Serbian footballers
German footballers
Yugoslav footballers
FK Vojvodina players
FK Spartak Subotica players
Yugoslav First League players
Karlsruher SC players
Karlsruher SC II players
SV Darmstadt 98 players
1. FC Schweinfurt 05 players
Association football defenders
2. Bundesliga players